Urbano Tavares Rodrigues, GCIH (December 6, 1923 – August 9, 2013) was a Portuguese professor of literature, a literary critic and a fiction writer, winner of many literary prizes.

Life

Urbano Tavares Rodrigues was born in Lisbon on December 6, 1923, son of a family of large landowners of Moura, Alentejo.
He attended primary school in Moura. 
After moving to Lisbon he joined the Camões Lyceum (Liceu Camões), where he was a fellow student of Luís Lindley Cintra and Antonio, brother of Vasco Gonçalves
He graduated from the Faculty of Arts of the University of Lisbon, where he studied Romance Philology. 
He was a friend of Mário Soares from his youth, although they did not always agree over politics.

Rodrigues was an activist in opposition to the authoritarian Estado Novo regime, which made it difficult for him to find work as a teacher.
He was always linked to the Portuguese Communist Party.
He spent some time in prison in Caxias, and for a long period he was in exile in France. 
He met some of the intellectuals of the 1950s in Paris, including Albert Camus, who became a friend.
He taught at the French universities of Montpellier, Aix and the Sorbonne in Paris.
He moved back to Portugal after the return of freedom of expression and democracy in Portugal on April 25, 1974.
In 1984 he obtained a PhD in Literature for a thesis on the work of Manuel Teixeira Gomes.
In 1993 he retired from the Faculty of Arts of the University of Lisbon as a full professor.

Rodrigues wrote for various magazines and newspapers, including the Bulletin des Études Portugaises, Colóquio-Letras, Jornal de Letras, Vértice and Nouvel Ovservateur.
He was director of the review Europa and theater critic for the journals O Século and Diário de Lisboa.
He was a co-founder of the Minotauro publishing house with Figueiredo Sobral.
This company published the Minotauro magazine.
Rodrigues was a member of the Lisbon Academy of Science and the Academy of Brazilian Literature.
He received various literary awards including the Prémio Ricardo Malheiros, the prizes of the International Association of Literary Critics and of the Cultural Press, and the grand prize of Conto Camilo Castelo Branco.

Urbano Tavares Rodrigues died at the Capuchin Hospital in Lisbon on August 9, 2013.

Selected bibliography

Novels

 1959 - Uma Pedrada no Charco
 1961; 2003 - Os Insubmissos
 1962; 1982 - Exílio Perturbado
 1966; 1988 - Imitação da Felicidade
 1967; 1974 - Despedidas de Verão
 1968 - Tempo de Cinzas
 1974; 1999 - Dissolução
 1979; 1986 - Desta Água Beberei
 1986; 1987 - A Vaga de Calor
 1989 - Filipa nesse Dia
 1991 - Violeta e a Noite
 1993 - Deriva
 1995 - A Hora da Incerteza
 1997 - O Ouro e o Sonho
 1998 - O Adeus à Brisa
 2000 - O Supremo Interdito
 2002 - Nunca Diremos quem sois
 2006 - Ao contrário das Ondas

Travels

 1949 - Santiago de Compostela
 1956 - Jornadas no Oriente
 1958 - Jornadas na Europa
 1963 - De Florença a Nova Iorque
 1973 - Viagem à União Soviética e Outras Páginas
 1973 - Redescoberta da França
 1976 - Registos de Outono Quente
 1999 - Agosto no Cairo: 1956

Essays

 1950 - Manuel Teixeira Gomes
 1954 - Présentation de castro Alves
 1957 - O Tema da Morte na Moderna Poesia Portuguesa
 1960; 1981 - O Mito de Don Juan
 1960 - Teixeira Gomes e a Reacção Antinaturalista
 1961 - Noites de Teatro
 1962; 2001 - O Algarve na Obra de Teixeira Gomes
 1964 - O Romance Francês Contemporâneo
 1966; 1978 - O Tema da Morte: Ensaios
 1966; 1978 - Realismo, Arte de Vanguarda e Nova Cultura
 1968 - A Saudade na Poesia Portuguesa
 1969 - Escritos Temporais
 1971; 2001 - Ensaios de Escreviver
 1977 - Ensaios de Após-Abril
 1980 - O Gosto de Ler
 1981 - Um Novo Olhar sobre o Neo-Realismo
 1984 - Manuel Teixeira Gomes: O Discurso do Desejo
 1993 - A Horas e Desoras
 1994 - Tradição e ruptura
 1995 - O Homem sem Imagem
 2001 - O Texto sobre o Texto
 2003 - A Flor da Utopia

References

Sources

1923 births
2013 deaths
Portuguese Communist Party politicians
Portuguese male writers
University of Lisbon alumni
Portuguese communists
Portuguese atheists